Srabosti Dutta Tinni is a Bangladeshi television actress and model. She was selected Miss Bangladesh in 2004.

Career
Tinni participated in the Anondodhara Photogenic 2002 Pageant and stood fifth runner up. Then she started her ramp modeling career. In 2004 she started her acting career in the drama serial 69, created by Mostofa Sarwar Farooki.

Before moving to Canada in 2017, she acted in a one-hour play titled Ekti Nil Kuashar Mrittyu, directed by Parvez Amin which was her last appearance on television so far.

Works

Television

Films

Personal life
Tinni was first married to actor  Adnan Faruque Hillol since 28 December 2006 for two years. Together they have a daughter Warisha. After the divorce, she married Adnan Huda Saad on 18 February 2014. She has another daughter with him. This marriage also ended up in divorce by 2017.

In an interview in July 2017, Tinni mentioned about her drug addiction and the following long-term rehabilitation. She currently resides in Montreal, Canada with her daughter Warisha.

References

External links
 

Living people
Bangladeshi television actresses
Bangladeshi film actresses
Bengali Hindus
Bangladeshi Hindus
Year of birth missing (living people)
Place of birth missing (living people)